Miliano Jonathans (born 5 April 2004) is a Dutch football player. He plays as right winger or attacking midfielder for Eredivisie club Vitesse.

Club career
Jonathans joined the youth system of Vitesse at the age of 10. He made his Eredivisie debut for Vitesse on 24 April 2022 in a game against Willem II.

On 31 August 2022, Jonathans signed a new contract with Vitesse until 2025.

References

External links
 

2004 births
Footballers from Arnhem
Living people
Dutch footballers
Association football forwards
SBV Vitesse players
Eredivisie players